The Rhaetian Railway Ge 2/2 is a class of small metre gauge 1 kV DC electric locomotives operated by the Rhaetian Railway (RhB), which is the main railway network in the Canton of Graubünden, Switzerland.

The class is so named under the Swiss locomotive and railcar classification system. According to that system, Ge 2/2 denotes a narrow gauge electric adhesion locomotive with a total of two axles, both of which are drive axles.  There are only two locomotives in the class, and they are numbered 161 and 162.

Both direct current locomotives were procured by the Berninabahn (BB) in 1911 for piloting duties. The then still brown liveried machines were given the numbers Ge 2/2 61 and 62, and were equipped with Lyra pantographs.  After the Rhaetian Railway takeover of the BB, they were given the new numbers they still bear.  Today, they work mainly as shunting locomotives in Poschiavo. 

On the Appenzeller Bahnen (AB), there is another locomotive, Te 49, that is of similar appearance, and dates from 1912.  Between 1955 and 1975, it operated as Ge 2/2 49.

Further reading 
 Patrick Belloncle, Gian Brünger, Rolf Grossenbacher, Christian Müller: Das große Buch der Rhätischen Bahn 1889-2001. 
 Wolfgang Finke, Hans Schweers: Die Fahrzeuge der Rhätischen Bahn 1889-1998. Band 3: Triebfahrzeuge, Verlag Schweers+Wall Aachen, heute Köln, 
 Claude Jeanmaire: Die elektrischen und Dieseltriebfahrzeuge Schweizerischer Eisenbahn - Die Gleichstromlinen der Rhätischen Bahn. Verlag Eisenbahn, 

This article is based upon a translation of the German language version as at January 2010.

Bo locomotives
Electric locomotives of Switzerland
Rhaetian Railway locomotives
Railway locomotives introduced in 1911
Metre gauge electric locomotives
1000 V DC locomotives